Abuko United Football Club is a Gambian sports club based in Abuko near Kombo North/Saint Mary.
The Men's team play in the Serrekunda East Sports Development Organisation.

The Women's team play in Gambian Championnat National D1 Woman.

Stadium
Currently the team plays at the 10000 capacity Serrekunda East Mini-Stadium.

References

External links

Football clubs in the Gambia